Wolfgang Schüler (born 17 February 1958) is a German former professional footballer who played as a striker or midfielder.

He played combined 414 matches in the Bundesliga und 2. Bundesliga.

References

External links
 
 

1958 births
Living people
German footballers
Association football midfielders
Karlsruher SC players
SC Freiburg players
SV Darmstadt 98 players
Borussia Dortmund players
Stuttgarter Kickers players
1. FC Saarbrücken players
Bundesliga players
2. Bundesliga players
20th-century German people